Liopinus wiltii is a species of beetle in the family Cerambycidae. It was described by Horn in 1880.

References

Acanthocinini
Beetles described in 1880